Pletvar is a village in Municipality of Prilep, North Macedonia. The critically endangered Macedonian grayling butterfly is only found in the Pletvar area.

Demographics
According to the 2002 census, the village had a total of 22 inhabitants. Ethnic groups in the village include:

Macedonians 21
Serbs 1

References

Villages in Prilep Municipality